Janardan Sharma is a Nepalese politician and former Finance Minister of Nepal. He is a three-time parliamentarian. He has previously served as Minister of Home Affairs, Energy, and Peace and ReconstructionNepal.

Electoral history

2008 Constituent Assembly election 
Rukum-2

2013 Constituent Assembly election 
Rukum-2

2017 House of Representatives Election 
Rukum West

2022 House of Representatives Election 
Rukum West

Controversy

2022 Budget Controversy 
Sharma was accused of changing tax rates inviting unauthorized persons a day before budget for the next fiscal year was announced. Annapurna Post first broke the news. He later resigned. Parliamentary Probe Special Committee was formed to investigate the controversy. The committee concluded that they could not confirm the allegations about Sharma inviting outsiders to change the tax rates. He was later re-appointed as Finance Minister.

References 

Communist Party of Nepal (Maoist Centre) politicians
Nepalese military personnel
Living people
Nepal Communist Party (NCP) politicians
Nepal MPs 2017–2022
People of the Nepalese Civil War
Finance ministers of Nepal
Members of the 1st Nepalese Constituent Assembly
Members of the 2nd Nepalese Constituent Assembly
1963 births
Nepal MPs 2022–present